{{Infobox university
|name = Padre Conceicao College of Engineering
|established = 1997
|city = Verna
|native_name = Padre Conceição (Portuguese), Padre Konseisanv (Konkani)
|image =Padre_Conceição_College_Of_Engineering.jpg
|image_size = 160px
|motto = Love your neighbour as yourself|director = Fr. Orlando Rodrigues
|principal = Mahesh B. Parappagoudar
|state = Goa
|country = India
|address = Agnel Technical Education Complex, Agnel ganv, Verna, Goa
|colours =
|athletics_affiliations =
|type = Private unaided engineering college
|website = 
}}

Padre Conceição College of Engineering (PCCE) is a private engineering college in Verna, Goa, India, established in 1997. The college is affiliated to Goa University, Taleigao, Goa, and the programmes are approved by All India Council for Technical Education (AICTE), New Delhi. The college is a part of Agnel Technical Education Complex, Verna, Goa and the college campus was designed by civil engineer Olavo Carvalho. PCCE was the first private engineering college in the state. The students of PCCE call themselves as Pacers''.

History
The college is named after Fr. Conceicao Rodrigues, a patriot and founder of Agnel Ashram, who died in 1984 after making a contribution in the field of technical education at national level. Rev. Fr. Conceicao Rodrigues was a visionary and freedom fighter. Under his inspiration, the Agnel Fathers (the trustees of the Society of St. Francis Xavier, Pilar) established technical education complexes around India. The then Director of Technical Education of the State of Maharashtra, Prof. G. Kadu in his oration at the funeral of Fr. Conceicao Rodrigues, called him a Saint of Technical Education.

Academics
The college conducts four-year degree programmes in the fields of computer engineering, electronics and telecommunication engineering, mechanical engineering and information technology.

The college is affiliated to Goa University, Taleigao Goa, and all the programmes are approved by All India Council for Technical Education (AICTE), New Delhi.

Mechanical engineering
The degree programme in mechanical engineering has been in existence since the inception of the college in 1997. The course is approved by the All India Council for Technical Education (AICTE). The course is of four years duration, each year consisting of two semesters. The students  undertake a project during the final year. The course has a capacity of 75 students per year.

Electronics and telecommunication engineering

Labs

Communication Engineering Lab

The students carry out projects usually every semester in subjects such as signals and systems, communication engineering, digital signal processing and digital image processing. There are a number of digital signal processing kits with which the students can implement the projects. There are communication engineering trainer kits that helps the students to understand the concepts of networking. Each year the final year students carry out projects under the guidance of the faculty in this lab.

Advanced Microprocessor Lab
The lab provides the students with microprocessor eits and other electronic devices required to program and implement the circuits ranging from a simplest LED lighting system to advanced robotics projects. Projects carried out in the lab have won awards at National Level Technical Symposiums.

Digital Systems Lab
The lab introduces students to digital electronics and lays a foundation for advanced courses such as Microprocessors and Micro Controllers.

Basic Electrical Lab
The lab is a part of the introductory course for the freshers in order to learn electric circuits, LEDs, and other simple electronics and electrical components that act as a foundation for the courses that follow in the advanced semesters.

Computer engineering
The degree programme in computer engineering has been in existence since the inception of the college in 1997. The course is approved by the All India Council for Technical Education (AICTE). The course is of 4 years duration, each year consisting of two semesters. The students undertake a project during the final year. The course has an intake of 60 students.

Information technology
The degree programme in information technology was started in 2000. The course is approved by the All India Council for Technical Education (AICTE). The course is of four years duration, each year consisting of two semesters. The students undertake a project during the final year. The course has an intake of 60 students per year.

Postgraduate degree courses
 M.E. Information Technology (Internet Technologies)

Student life 
PCCE students play many sports such as badminton and football.

Campus
PCCE has the fourth largest campus among the engineering colleges in Goa, with a library that houses around 13,000 books.

Cultural and non-academic activities

Annual cultural fest: Mithya 
Each year the student council organize the inter department cultural event, under the guidance of the faculty.

Annual technical fest: Techyon

Each year the students of the department organize a national level technical fest. The organizing committee is the student council. Under the guidance of the faculty, the society is responsible for organizing technical events and provides technical assistance to juniors.

Fest events 
 Hackathon is an inter collegiate competition where teams of 2 to 3 must build an application or a computer software. The application or the software is based on a theme which is given to the participants. A time limit of 2 days is given and the participants are allowed to work overnight and off campus.
 RoboWars is an inter collegiate competition where teams of five must construct, deploy and operate a fighting robot in a gladiatorial arena. Rules follow the traditional "RoboWar" league guidelines with only one weight category (<25 kg). Viewed as more of an entertainment event than an educational one; the decision to include it was based on the enthusiasm of students; the mechanical engineering department in particular.
 Hardwired is a circuit building competition, where the students construct a circuit of their choice. The winners are judged based on the usefulness, understanding and the efforts involved in building the circuit.
 Speak out is a technical paper presentation competition, where the students present their own technical topic in front of faculty and guests from industry.
 Quiz is an open quiz on the final day of the event. Students from colleges from the state and also from other states, participate in the event.
 The fest has literary events and a photography competition.

Linkages
The college has associations and linkages with industry and other organisations, such as a Memorandum of Understanding with National Institute of Oceanography, EMC Corporation, and D-Link. Workshops, seminars, conferences and field visits are organised in coordination with industry.

Reputation and standards
Being affiliated with Goa University, a university with an accreditation from the NAAC, the students answer the same exams as the government-run Goa Engineering College.

Sister institutes
 Fr. Conceicao Rodrigues College of Engineering, Bandra, Mumbai
 Fr. Conceicao Rodrigues Institute of Technology, Vashi, Mumbai
 Agnel Institute of Technology and Design, Assagao, Goa
 Father Agnel Polytechnic, New Delhi

Location
By road: the college is on National Highway 17 at Verna between the Panaji and Margao cities. The college is close to the Electronic City at Verna.

References

External links
 Official website

Engineering colleges in Goa
Educational institutions established in 1997
Education in South Goa district
1997 establishments in Goa